Vṛṣabha, or Vrishabha, is a month in the Indian solar calendar. It corresponds to the zodiacal sign of Taurus, and overlaps with about the second half of May and about the first half of June in the Gregorian calendar. The first day of the month is called Vrishbha Sankranti, and it generally falls on May 14th or 15th.

In Vedic texts, the month of Vrsabha is called Madhava (IAST: Mādhava), but in these ancient texts it has no zodiacal associations. The solar month of Vrsabha overlaps with the lunar month of Jyeshtha in Hindu lunisolar calendars. Vrsabha is preceded by the solar month of Mesha and followed by the solar month of Mithuna.

The month of Vrsabha is called Vaikasi in the Tamil Hindu calendar. The ancient and medieval era Sanskrit texts of India vary in their calculations about the duration of Vrsabha, just like they do with other months. For example, the Surya Siddhanta calculates the duration of Vrsabha to be 31 days, 10 hours, 5 minutes and 12 seconds. In contrast, the Arya Siddhanta calculates the duration of Vrsabha to be 31 days, 9 hours, 37 minutes and 36 seconds.

The Indian solar month names are significant in epigraphical studies of South Asia. For example, Vrsabha month, along with other solar months, are found inscribed in medieval era Hindu temples, sometimes spelled as the Rishabha month.

Vrsabha is also an astrological sign in Indian horoscope systems, corresponding to Taurus.

Vrsabha is also the twelfth month in the Darian calendar for the planet Mars, when the Sun traverses the central sector of the constellation Taurus as seen from Mars.

References

Hindu solar months